Daniel Williamson (born 5 December 1973) is an English former professional footballer who played as a midfielder.

He notably played in the Premier League for West Ham United and Everton, as well as in the Football League for Doncaster Rovers and for non-league side Farnborough Town. He suffered a foot injury in 1997 which would eventually lead him to prematurely retire three years later.

Early life
Williamson was born in West Ham, London in December 1973. As a youth, he cheered on the Hammers from the North Bank at Upton Park. He played for Newham and Essex Schoolboys, signed schoolboy forms with West Ham, completed a two-year apprenticeship and signed professional forms in 1992. He was a strong-running right-footed attacking midfielder, who liked to play in a central position but was equally at home on the right-hand side.

Club career

West Ham United
After signing professional forms with West Ham in July 1992, Williamson was loaned out to non-league side, Farnborough Town, making his debut in a 3–2 home defeat against Runcorn on 6 February 1993 and a total of six appearances between February and March 1993.
He was loaned out again to Third Division side, Doncaster Rovers, in October 1993 where he made 16 league and cup appearances, scoring three goals. He played the final three games of the 1993/94 season for West Ham, making his debut in a 2–0 win at Arsenal on 30 April 1994 and scoring his first goal for the club in a 3–3 draw with Southampton on 7 May 1994.
Competition for the midfield places from John Moncur and Don Hutchison and an ankle injury restricted him to only four appearances in 1994/95. However, he gained a regular place in the first-team in the 1995/96 season, when he made 37 league and cup appearances and scored four goals, helping West Ham to finish in the top-half of the table for the first time in ten years. Harry Redknapp said of him, "He was an outstanding passer of the ball. He had a terrific shot on him and I always thought he was going to be a very good player." Another ankle injury interrupted his season in 1996/97, when he made 18 league and cup appearances. His season ended in March 1997 after he had surgery on the ankle.
He made a total of 58 league and cup appearances for West Ham, scoring five goals.

Everton

In August 1997, Williamson moved to Everton in an exchange for David Unsworth and £1 million as Howard Kendall sought to add creativity and strength to the Everton midfield and Harry Redknapp sought a left-sided centre-half to fill a gap created by a long-term injury to captain Julian Dicks. He made his debut for Everton in a 2–1 victory over West Ham on 23 August 1997 and went on to make a total of 17 appearances for Everton in the 1997/98 season. He picked up a foot injury against Wimbledon on 13 December 1997 and the injury, which required surgery, and subsequent complications led him to miss the rest of the 1997/98 season and the two following seasons 1998–1999 and 1999–2000.

Williamson did return to training in September 1999, declaring he was relieved to be showing that his injury problems were behind him. However, after breaking down again in training, he never played another first-team game for Everton and his playing contract with the club was terminated at the end of September 2000, nine months early, which also marked the end of his playing career.

Williamson's time at Everton was a costly one for the club. He was labelled as one of the highest rated English players at the time of purchase and made a bright start to his Everton career.

Personal life
Williamson lives in Essex and works for a property company.

Career stats

References

Danny Williamson (West Ham), Sporting-Heroes.net. Retrieved 8 July 2007.
Danny Williamson (Everton), Sporting-Heroes.net. Retrieved 8 July 2007.
The Wonderful World of West Ham United statistics

1973 births
Living people
Footballers from West Ham
English footballers
West Ham United F.C. players
Doncaster Rovers F.C. players
Farnborough F.C. players
Everton F.C. players
Premier League players
English Football League players
Association football midfielders